The women's regu sepak takraw competition at the 2006 Asian Games in Doha was held from 8 December to 10 December at the Al-Sadd Indoor Hall.

Squads

Results 
All times are Arabia Standard Time (UTC+03:00)

Preliminary

Group X

|-
|8 December||09:00
|align=right|
|align=center|2–0
|align=left|
|21–5||21–6||
|-
|8 December||10:00
|align=right|
|align=center|1–2
|align=left|
|14–21||23–21||11–15
|-
|8 December||19:00
|align=right|
|align=center|2–0
|align=left|
|23–21||21–13||
|-
|8 December||20:00
|align=right|
|align=center|2–0
|align=left|
|21–9||21–5||
|-
|9 December||10:00
|align=right|
|align=center|0–2
|align=left|
|10–21||12–21||
|-
|9 December||14:00
|align=right|
|align=center|2–0
|align=left|
|21–7||21–14||

Group Y

|-
|8 December||15:00
|align=right|
|align=center|2–0
|align=left|
|21–5||21–11||
|-
|8 December||16:00
|align=right|
|align=center|2–1
|align=left|
|21–16||22–24||15–8
|-
|8 December||19:00
|align=right|
|align=center|2–1
|align=left|
|18–21||21–12||15–10
|-
|8 December||20:00
|align=right|
|align=center|2–0
|align=left|
|21–9||21–5||
|-
|9 December||09:00
|align=right|
|align=center|0–2
|align=left|
|15–21||13–21||
|-
|9 December||15:00
|align=right|
|align=center|0–2
|align=left|
|18–21||12–21||

Knockout round

Semifinals

|-
|10 December||09:00
|align=right|
|align=center|2–0
|align=left|
|21–11||21–10||
|-
|10 December||10:00
|align=right|
|align=center|2–0
|align=left|
|21–12||21–12||

Final

|-
|10 December||16:00
|align=right|
|align=center|2–1
|align=left|
|19–21||23–21||15–9

References 

Official Website

Sepak takraw at the 2006 Asian Games